This is list of members of the Argentine Chamber of Deputies from 10 December 2007 to 9 December 2009.

Composition

By province

By political groups
as of 9 December 2009

Election cycles

List of deputies

Notes

References

External links
List of deputies in the official website (archived)

2007
2007 in Argentina
2008 in Argentina
2009 in Argentina